Winston Earle is a retired Jamaican footballer. After beginning his career in Jamaica with Santos, he later played in the NASL between 1968 and 1975 for the Baltimore Bays, Rochester Lancers and Baltimore Comets. He is currently the Assistant Coach of Johns Hopkins, and previously coached at Bay College of Maryland, Baltimore Community College, Morgan State and Coppin State.

References

External links
 NASL career stats

1948 births
Living people
Jamaican footballers
Jamaican expatriate footballers
Jamaican football managers
Baltimore Bays players
Rochester Lancers (1967–1980) players
Baltimore Comets players
North American Soccer League (1968–1984) players
Sportspeople from Kingston, Jamaica
Coppin State Eagles
Santos F.C. (Jamaica) players
Association football defenders
Expatriate soccer players in the United States
Jamaican expatriate football managers
Jamaican expatriate sportspeople in the United States
Expatriate soccer managers in the United States
Morgan State Bears coaches
Johns Hopkins Blue Jays coaches